The Adolphus and Sarah Ingalsbe House is located in Columbus, Wisconsin, United States. It was added to the National Register of Historic Places in 2009. Additionally, it is listed on the Wisconsin State Register of Historic Places.

History
The house was built by Adolphus and Sarah Ingalsbe, originally from New York City who moved to Columbus after finding success during the California Gold Rush. In 1875, the house went underwent substantial renovations that increased its size.

References

Houses in Columbia County, Wisconsin
Houses completed in 1853
Houses on the National Register of Historic Places in Wisconsin
Italianate architecture in Wisconsin
Columbus, Wisconsin
National Register of Historic Places in Columbia County, Wisconsin